Giuliano Frano (born May 16, 1993) is a Canadian soccer player for Woodbridge Strikers in League1 Ontario.

Club career

Early career
Frano began his college career at the University of Montevallo.  In his two seasons with the Falcons, he made a total of 40 appearances and tallied four goals and 13 assists.  In 2013, Frano transferred to Boston College.  In his first season with the Eagles, he made 18 appearances and led the team with four goals.  He also had two assists.  In his senior year, he made 16 appearances.

Seattle Sounders 2
On March 21, 2015, Frano signed a professional contract with USL club Seattle Sounders FC 2.  He made his professional debut that same day in a 4–2 victory over Sacramento Republic FC.  On April 11, 2015, Frano scored his first professional goal in a 2–1 victory over Portland Timbers 2.

Whitecaps FC 2
Frano signed with Whitecaps FC 2 on January 27, 2016  In December 2016, Whitecaps FC 2 announced that Frano would not return to the club for the 2017 season.

Sigma FC
In 2017 and 2018, Frano played for League1 Ontario club Sigma FC. He was named to the league's All-Star Team and Best XI both seasons.

Forge FC
On February 7, 2019 Frano signed with Canadian Premier League club Forge FC. He made his debut for Forge in their inaugural game against York 9 FC on April 27, and scored his first goal for the Hamilton side against Pacific FC on May 8. On July 31, 2020 Forge announced Frano had departed the club to pursue personal business interests.

Woodbridge Strikers
In 2021 and 2022, he returned to League1 Ontario with the Woodbridge Strikers.

International career
On September 23, 2015 Frano was called up to the Canadian U23 squad for the 2015 CONCACAF Men's Olympic Qualifying Championship as an injury replacement for Mark-Anthony Kaye.

Personal life
Frano was born in Mississauga, Ontario to an Italian father and a Canadian mother.

Honours
Individual
League1 Ontario First Team All Star: 2017, 2018

References

External links
Boston College bio

1993 births
Living people
Association football midfielders
Canadian soccer players
Soccer players from Mississauga
Canadian people of Italian descent
Canadian expatriate soccer players
Expatriate soccer players in the United States
Canadian expatriate sportspeople in the United States
Montevallo Falcons athletes
Boston College Eagles men's soccer players
Tacoma Defiance players
Whitecaps FC 2 players
Forge FC players
USL Championship players
League1 Ontario players
Canadian Premier League players
Canada men's under-23 international soccer players
Sigma FC players
Woodbridge Strikers players